The Wyoming Constitution is the supreme governing document of the U.S. state of Wyoming. It was approved by a statewide vote of 6,272 to 1,923 on November 5, 1889. It was last amended in 2008. It was the first constitution in the United States which explicitly gave women the right to vote (though an earlier New Jersey constitution gave women who owned property the right to vote because of an ambiguity in its text). The Wyoming state legislature also approved this with minor changes in 1896.

References

External links

 Wyoming law
 State constitutions of the United States
1889 establishments in Wyoming Territory
 History of women's rights in the United States